Pineville is a city in Rapides Parish, Louisiana, United States. It is located across the Red River from the larger Alexandria. Pineville is hence part of the Alexandria Metropolitan Statistical Area. The population was 14,555 at the 2010 census. It had been 13,829 in 2000; population hence grew by 5 percent over the preceding decade.

The Central Louisiana State Hospital, the Pinecrest Supports and Services Center, the Huey P. Long Memorial Hospital (closed), the Alexandria Veterans Administration Medical Center, and the Alexandria National Cemetery are all located in Pineville. The city is also home to several large non-government employers including Baker Manufacturing, Procter & Gamble, and Crest Industries.

Original LSU in Pineville
Louisiana State University was founded by the Louisiana General Assembly in 1853. It was founded under the name Louisiana State Seminary of Learning & Military Academy and was located near Pineville. The first academic session began on January 2, 1860, with General William Tecumseh Sherman of Ohio as superintendent.

Geography
Pineville is located at  (31.338781, −92.412485).

According to the United States Census Bureau, the city has a total area of 12.1 square miles (31.3 km2), of which 11.5 square miles (29.7 km2) is land and 0.6 square mile (1.6 km2) (4.97%) is water.

Climate
This climatic region is typified by large seasonal temperature differences, with warm to hot and humid summers and mild winters.  According to the Köppen Climate Classification system, Pineville has a humid subtropical climate, abbreviated "Cfa" on climate maps.

Demographics

2020 census

As of the 2020 United States census, there were 14,384 people, 5,065 households, and 3,063 families residing in the city.

2000 census
As of the census of 2000, there were 13,829 people, 4,994 households, and 3,121 families residing in the city. The racial makeup of the city was 69.57% White, 26.08% African American, 0.51% Native American, 1.90% Asian, 0.09% Pacific Islander, 0.30% from other races, and 1.55% from two or more races. Hispanic or Latino of any race were 1.14% of the population.

There were 4,994 households, out of which 30.8% had children under the age of eighteen living with them, 44.4% were married couples living together, 14.6% had a female householder with no husband present, and 37.5% were non-families. 32.5% of all households were made up of individuals, and 12.2% had someone living alone who was 65 years of age or older. The average household size was 2.35 and the average family size was 3.00.

In the city, the population was spread out, with 22.5% under the age of 18, 13.1% from 18 to 24, 29.1% from 25 to 44, 22.2% from 45 to 64, and 13.1% who were 65 years of age or older. The median age was 35 years. For every 100 females, there were 97.8 males. For every 100 females age 18 and over, there were 97.3 males.

The median income for a household in the city was $29,159, and the median income for a family was $37,735. Males had a median income of $30,205 versus $21,154 for females. The per capita income for the city was $15,969. About 14.3% of families and 20.8% of the population were below the poverty line, including 20.5% of those under age 18 and 19.9% of those age 65 or over.

Museums

Pineville houses two unique museums. The Louisiana Maneuvers Museum provides insight into the huge maneuvers that prepared the United States for World War II and promoted the career of General Dwight D. Eisenhower, known for his organizational skills.

Old Town Hall Museum "is the only museum in the entire state of Louisiana dedicated to municipal government".

Government and infrastructure
The Louisiana Department of Public Safety & Corrections J. Levy Dabadie Correctional Center was located on the property of Camp Beauregard and in Pineville. It closed in July 2012.

From 1939 to 2014, the former Huey P. Long Medical Center, a state charity hospital named for Governor and U.S. Senator Huey Pierce Long, Jr., operated on Main Street in Pineville. Officials are seeking to have the structure placed into the National Register of Historic Places, under the original name of Huey P. Long Memorial Hospital.

The Curtis-Coleman Memorial Bridge, the replacement for the former O. K. Allen Bridge, named for former Governor Oscar K. Allen, links Alexandria and Pineville across the Red River. The bridge is named for two African-American politicians, former state Representative Israel "Bo" Curtis of Alexandria and Lemon Coleman (1935–2015), the first Black person to serve on the Pineville City Council. Coleman unseated the white incumbent, William George "Willie" Goleman (1899–1976), a fellow Democrat, in the 1974 election in a majority white-voter council district.

National Guard
Located adjacent to the city is Camp Beauregard. Operated by the Louisiana Army National Guard, it is the headquarters of the 225th Engineer Brigade and is one of the largest engineer units in the US Army.

Education
In 1906, the Southern Baptist–affiliated Louisiana College opened in Pineville. The Rapides Parish School Board operates public schools.

Liquor sales in restaurants
Until a special election held on October 19, 2013, Pineville had long been a fully dry city, with no alcohol available legally in the community. Voters in the 1980s maintained that stance in a referendum. The late Mayor Fred Baden was particularly known for his opposition to liquor sales. Mayor Clarence Fields, who has held his office since 1999, pushed for another referendum to permit the sale of liquor in restaurants. Nearly four years after Baden's death, the measure was roundly approved by voters in the special election, 1,849 (78 percent) to 515 (22 percent).

Nine restaurants in Pineville had received permits to serve alcohol since January 2014. Fields claims that allowing limited liquor sales, requested by area developers, will boost economic development, particularly along the riverfront. According to Fields, members of the clergy, including city council member Nathan Martin of the Christian Challenge Worship Center in Pineville, did not oppose the call for liquor sales: "We've had a lot of conversations with our religious community, and all of the ministers I have spoken with are favorable.".

The liquor referendum was authored by State Senator Rick Gallot. In the previous referendum in 1981, liquor sales in restaurants had not been one of the options available for consideration. Gallot's Senate Bill 116 allows cities within the population range of 13,500 to 16,500 to call for an election to permit restaurants to sell alcoholic beverages. The Pineville City Council then voted unanimously to place the referendum on the special election ballot.

Notable people
 Joe W. Aguillard, president of Louisiana College from 2005 to 2014
 Rick Brewer, president of Louisiana College since 2015
 Faith Ford, actress
 W. C. Friley, president of Louisiana College from 1909 to 1910
 Lawrence T. Fuglaar, state representative for Rapides Parish from 1948 to 1952
 Justin Gaston, actor, model, and singer who was also a contestant on Nashville Star.
 G. Earl Guinn, president of Louisiana College from 1951 to 1975
 Jeff Hall, state representative for District 26 in Rapides Parish; former Pineville resident
 Henry E. Hardtner, lumber magnate, state legislator, and forestry conservationist, born in Pineville in 1870
 Ben F. Holt, state representative from Rapides Parish from 1956 to 1960 
 Anjanette Kirkland, track and field athlete
 Rory Lee, president of Louisiana College from 1997 to 2004
 Rashard Lewis, professional basketball player with the Miami Heat
 Robert L. Lynn, Louisiana College president from 1975 to 1997; now a poet in Duluth, Georgia
 Hugh Thompson Jr., United States Army major who played a role in ending the My Lai massacre in the Vietnam War; he died in Pineville.
 Tommy Tenney, evangelist and author
 Kenny Mixon, played football at Pineville High, LSU and with NFL.

Pineville gallery

See also

References

External links

 City of Pineville

 
Cities in Alexandria metropolitan area, Louisiana
Cities in Louisiana
Cities in Rapides Parish, Louisiana
Cities in the Central Louisiana